Antonia Laura Thomas (born 3 November 1986) is a British actress. She is best known for her roles as Alisha Daniels in the E4 comedy-drama series Misfits, Evie Douglas in the Channel 4/Netflix comedy series Lovesick and Dr. Claire Browne in the ABC drama series The Good Doctor.

Early life
Antonia Laura Thomas was born in London in 1986, the daughter of a Jamaican mother, Veronica Thomas, a psychologist (a retired Head of Psychology at St Thomas’ hospital, London) and British father David Thomas, who is a classical singer.

She has two older sisters, Emma Jay Thomas, also an actress, and Chloe Lucy Thomas, a journalist.

She received a BA in acting from the Bristol Old Vic Theatre School in 2009, and then joined the National Youth Theatre.

Career
Thomas was cast as Alisha Daniels in Misfits in 2009, one day after leaving Bristol Old Vic Theatre School. She confirmed her exit from Misfits in late 2011, stating that she had an "amazing time" on the show. In 2012, she appeared in the music video for the Coldplay song "Charlie Brown".

In 2013, Thomas was in the film Sunshine on Leith. In 2014, she played the role of Evie in the British rom-com TV show Scrotal Recall which aired on Channel 4. After finding success on Netflix, the streaming network went on to commission a second series of eight episodes, without Channel 4's involvement, which was made available internationally on the streaming network in November 2016 under the new title Lovesick.

In 2015, Thomas was featured in the music video for the Stereophonics' song "C'est La Vie" and narrated the opening and closing lines to the revival of the British children's television series Teletubbies.

She began appearing as Doctor Claire Browne in the US TV show, The Good Doctor in September 2017.

Filmography

Short film

Film

Television

Music videos

References

External links

English people of Jamaican descent
21st-century English actresses
Actresses from London
Black British actresses
English television actresses
National Youth Theatre members
Alumni of Bristol Old Vic Theatre School
Living people
1986 births
People educated at the City of London School for Girls